The 1991 USA Outdoor Track and Field Championships took place between June 13–15 at Downing Stadium on Randall's Island in New York City. This was the last USA Outdoor Track and Field Championships organized by The Athletics Congress. The following year's Olympic Trials served as the National Championships during the last year of TAC's existence. The competition acted as a way of selecting the United States team for the 1991 World Championships in Athletics in Tokyo, Japan August 23 to September 1 later that year.

Results

Men track events

Men field events

Women track events

Women field events

See also
United States Olympic Trials (track and field)

Notes

References
 Results from T&FN
 results

USA Outdoor Track and Field Championships
Usa Outdoor Track And Field Championships, 1991
Track and field
Track and field in New York City
Outdoor Track and Field Championships
Outdoor Track and Field Championships
Sports competitions in New York City
1990s in Manhattan
Randalls and Wards Islands